Arthur Zborzil (15 July 1885 – 15 October 1937) was a male tennis player from Austria. At the 1912 Stockholm Olympics he teamed up with Felix Pipes to win a silver medal in the men's doubles event.

Zborzil also competed at the 1908 Summer Olympics, but he lost his first match in the singles event as well as his first match with Felix Pipes in the doubles event.

References

1885 births
1937 deaths
Austrian male tennis players
Olympic tennis players of Austria
Olympic silver medalists for Austria
Tennis players at the 1908 Summer Olympics
Tennis players at the 1912 Summer Olympics
Olympic medalists in tennis
Medalists at the 1912 Summer Olympics